Jerry Smith (born September 26, 1987) is an American professional basketball player for Al-Arabi SC of the Qatari Basketball League.

High school
Jerry Smith played for Wauwatosa East High School where he holds the school's career scoring record.

College career
He is an alumnus of the University of Louisville men's basketball team. In his debut as a Cardinal, Smith broke the record for most points scored by a freshman in his first game. On February 17, 2007, Smith hit a deep, buzzer-beating 3-pointer that gave the Louisville Cardinals a 61-59 upset victory over Marquette University.

On February 17, 2007 Smith hit a game winning 35 footer at the buzzer. After the February 17 game, Crean gave credit to Jerry, saying that he "made a tough shot." Smith said he was speechless and that "I never dreamed about this."

Prior to college, Smith played AAU basketball for DTA of Milwaukee and the Playground Warriors. He helped the first of the two to a 2nd-place finish in the national tournament.

Professional career
Smith started playing for the Milwaukee Bucks NBA Summer League team in Las Vegas. Later he played for Springfield Armor in the NBA Development League. In March 2011 he signed with Waikato Pistons in New Zealand.

Smith was called up by the New Jersey Nets from the Springfield Armor on March 16, 2012. He made his NBA debut with 5 points in 20 minutes against Orlando. He returned to the Armor on March 26, 2012.

On July 11, 2012, Smith signed with Pallacanestro Cantù. In August 2013, he signed with Tezenis Verona.

In August 2014, he signed with Maccabi Rishon LeZion of Israel. On February 8, 2015, he left Maccabi and signed with Eisbären Bremerhaven of the German Basketball Bundesliga. On June 7, 2015, he re-signed with Eisbären Bremerhaven for one more season.

On August 6, 2018, he joined Ifaistos Limnou of the Greek Basket League. On August 7, 2019, Smith renewed his contract with the Greek club for another season. On August 19, 2020, Smith moved to fellow Greek Basket League club Larisa. On August 3, 2021, Smith signed with Greek Basket League finalists Lavrio. He averaged 8.4 points, 1.6 rebounds, and 1.2 assists per game.

On March 1, 2022, Smith signed with Final Spor of the Turkish Basketball First League. He subsequently joined OGM Ormanspor but left the team in November 2022 after three games. On March 4, 2023, Smith signed with Al-Arabi SC of the Qatari Basketball League.

The Basketball Tournament (TBT) (2017–present) 
In the summer of 2017, Smith played in The Basketball Tournament on ESPN for Team Challenge ALS. He competed for the $2 million prize in 2017, and for Team Challenge ALS, he averaged 9.2 points per game, also shooting 83 percent from the free-throw line. Smith helped take the sixth-seeded Team Challenge ALS to the Championship Game of the tournament, where they lost in a close game to Overseas Elite 86-83.

In TBT 2018, Smith averaged 2.8 points per game and one steal per game for Team Challenge ALS. They reached the West Regional Championship Game before losing to eventual tournament runner-up Eberlein Drive.

See also
 2006 high school boys basketball All-Americans

References

External links

 NBA G League profile
 Louisville Cardinals bio

1987 births
Living people
American expatriate basketball people in Germany
American expatriate basketball people in Greece
American expatriate basketball people in Israel
American expatriate basketball people in Italy
American expatriate basketball people in New Zealand
American expatriate basketball people in Turkey
American men's basketball players
Basketball players from Wisconsin
Eisbären Bremerhaven players
Ifaistos Limnou B.C. players
Larisa B.C. players
Lavrio B.C. players
Louisville Cardinals men's basketball players
Maccabi Rishon LeZion basketball players
New Jersey Nets players
Pallacanestro Cantù players
Parade High School All-Americans (boys' basketball)
People from Wauwatosa, Wisconsin
Point guards
Scaligera Basket Verona players
Sportspeople from the Milwaukee metropolitan area
Springfield Armor players
Undrafted National Basketball Association players
Waikato Pistons players